Paul Renaudie (born 2 April 1990 in Courbevoie) is a French middle-distance runner specialising in the 800 metres. He represented his country at two outdoor and two indoor European Championships.

International competitions

Personal bests
Outdoor
400 metres – 48.06 (Lens 2014)
800 metres – 1:45.85 (Lille 2012)
Indoor
400 metres – 48.90 (Eaubonne 2013)
800 metres – 1:47.80 (Stockholm 2016)
1000 metres – 2:20.67 (Metz 2014)
1500 metres – 3:50.97 (Fontainebleau 2016)

References

All-Athletics profile

1990 births
Living people
French male middle-distance runners
People from Courbevoie
Sportspeople from Hauts-de-Seine
Athletes (track and field) at the 2013 Mediterranean Games
Mediterranean Games competitors for France
20th-century French people
21st-century French people